Jason Raul Anavitarte (born June 14, 1978) is an American politician from Georgia. Anavitarte is a Republican member of the Georgia State Senate for District 31.

Before his election to the state Senate, Anavitarte was a member of the Paulding County School Board.

References

Republican Party Georgia (U.S. state) state senators
21st-century American politicians
Living people
1978 births